Great Britain, represented by the British Olympic Association (BOA), competed at the 1920 Summer Olympics in Antwerp, Belgium. 234 competitors, 218 men and 16 women, took part in 84 events in 21 sports. British athletes won fourteen gold medals (up from ten in 1912) and 43 medals overall, finishing third. It would be the last Olympic Games in which Irish athletes participated under Great Britain, after foundation of Irish Free State in 1922.

Aquatics

Diving

Five divers consisting of three men and two women, represented Great Britain in 1920. It was the nation's third appearance in the sport. Just as in 1912, the women had the better showing for the country. Armstrong posted the country's best result to that point, taking the silver medal in the platform. White, who had won Great Britain's only previous medal in the sport, was unable to match her bronze from 1912 and took fourth place in the platform.

 Men

Ranks given are within the semifinal group.

 Women

Ranks given are within the semifinal group.

Swimming

Eighteen swimmers, twelve men and six women, represented Great Britain in 1920. It was the nation's fourth appearance in the sport. Great Britain won two medals, one in each of the relays. The men took bronze, while the women took silver. Jeans was the only individual finalist for the country, advancing to the finals in both of the women's events and taking fourth place each time.

Ranks given are within the heat.

 Men

 Women

Water polo

Great Britain competed in the Olympic water polo tournament for the fourth time in 1920, the fifth appearance of the sport in the Olympics. Britain won its fourth (and final, through 2008) gold medal in the sport.

The Bergvall System was used in 1920. Great Britain won all three of its matches, taking the gold medal.

 Quarterfinals

 Semifinals

 Final

 Final rank  Gold

Athletics

41 athletes represented Great Britain in 1920. It was the nation's sixth appearance in athletics, having competed in the sport at every Olympics. With four medals of each type, Great Britain was the third most successful nation in athletics, behind the United States and Finland.

Ranks given are within the heat.

Boxing 

16 boxers represented Great Britain at the 1920 Games. It was the nation's second appearance in boxing. Great Britain was one of two countries to send two boxers in each of the eight weight classes, along with the United States. The British boxers won a total of six medals, one more than Canada and two more than the United States, but fell behind the Americans in number of gold medals three to two.

Cycling

Thirteen cyclists represented Great Britain in 1920. It was the nation's fourth appearance in the sport. Great Britain was one of six different nations to win a gold medal in the six cycling events; the British team also took three silvers and one bronze to make the nation the most successful cycling team in 1920. All of Great Britain's medals came in track cycling, with the gold coming from Lance and Ryan's tandem.

Road cycling

Track cycling

Ranks given are within the heat.

Fencing

Eighteen fencers represented Great Britain in 1920. It was the nation's fourth appearance in the sport. The British team's best individual result came from its only event finalist, Dalglish, who placed eighth in the sabre. The foil team placed fifth for the best overall result for Britain.

Ranks given are within the group.

Field hockey

Great Britain competed in field hockey for the second time, fielding a single team this time. The team took the gold medal in the four-team round robin, defeating each of the other three teams.

Football

Great Britain competed in the Olympic football tournament for the fourth time, having missed only the 1904 tournament. The country had won gold medals in each of its first three appearances while going undefeated. The team's streak was abruptly halted in 1920, however, with a stunning first round loss to Norway.

 First round

Final rank 10th

Gymnastics

Twenty-seven gymnasts represented Great Britain in 1920. It was the nation's fifth appearance in the sport, matched only by France. The British squad included only one team, with no gymnasts competing in the individual all-around. The team came in last place of the five competing countries.

Artistic gymnastics

Modern pentathlon

Four pentathletes represented Great Britain in 1920. It was the nation's second appearance in the sport, having competed in both instances of the Olympic pentathlon.

A point-for-place system was used, with the lowest total score winning.

Polo

Great Britain competed in the Olympic polo tournament for the third time, the only nation to have competed in each edition of the competition to that point (and, eventually, the entire time polo was played at the Olympics). Great Britain fielded a single team in 1920, as opposed to 1900 and 1908, when the country had players on six of the eight teams to play. The British team nevertheless took another gold medal, defeating Belgium in the semifinals and Spain in the final.

 Semifinals

 Final

 Final rank  Gold

Rowing

Ten rowers represented Great Britain in 1920. It was the nation's fourth appearance in the sport. Both of the British boats earned silver medals; in each instance, it was an American boat which beat Great Britain's representative in the final.

Ranks given are within the heat.

Sailing

Six sailors represented Great Britain in 1920. It was the nation's third appearance in the sport. Britain had the only female sailor of 1920. Both of the nation's boats took gold medals, without competition in the 18 foot class and over a Norwegian team in the 7 metre.

Skating

Figure skating

Six figure skaters represented Great Britain in 1920. It was the nation's second appearance in the sport; Great Britain was one of three countries to compete in both Summer Olympics figure skating competitions. The British team was able to capture only a single bronze medal in 1920.

Shooting

Seven shooters represented Great Britain in 1920. It was the nation's fifth appearance in the sport; France was one of three nations (along with Denmark and France) to have competed at each Olympic shooting contest to that point. The British shooters were unable to secure a medal for the first time since 1900.

Tennis

Eight tennis players, four men and four women, competed for Great Britain in 1920. It was the nation's fifth appearance in the sport, tied with France for the most of any country. The doubles competitions were Great Britain's strength, with both gold medals coming from pairs—men's and women's. The country added a pair of silver medals in the women's and mixed doubles. The British players also took a pair of medals in the women's singles; Holman took silver and McKane won the bronze.

Tug of war

Great Britain competed in the Olympic tug of war tournament for the third time in 1920, the final appearance of the sport in the Olympics. Along with Sweden and the United States, Great Britain's three appearances in the five Olympic tug of war tournaments were the most of any nation.

The Bergvall System was used in 1920. Great Britain won all three of its matches, taking the gold medal to become the only country to win two Olympic golds in the tug of war.

All matches were best-of-three pulls.

 Quarterfinals

 Semifinals

 Final

 Final rank  Gold

Weightlifting

Two weightlifters represented Great Britain in 1920. It was the nation's second appearance in the sport, having competed in 1896 but not 1900.

Wrestling

Ten wrestlers competed for Great Britain in 1920. It was the nation's fourth appearance in the sport. The British wrestlers competed only in the freestyle, with two wrestlers in each weight class. Bernard and Wright took bronze medals; they were the only two Britons to get any wins at all, winning two matches apiece.

Freestyle

Art competitions

References

External links
 
 
International Olympic Committee results database

Nations at the 1920 Summer Olympics
1920
Olympics
Olympics